Power of Three is a jazz album by Michel Petrucciani, recorded live at the Montreux Jazz Festival in 1986. It features Petrucciani playing several duets with guitarist Jim Hall, as well as three performances with Wayne Shorter joining the pair.

Track listing

LP release

Side A
 "Limbo" (Wayne Shorter) - 7:57
 "Careful" (Jim Hall) - 6:49
 "Morning Blues" (Michel Petrucciani) - 8:15

Side B
 "In a Sentimental Mood" (Duke Ellington) - 12:18
 "Bimini" (Jim Hall) - 10:05

CD release

 "Limbo" (Wayne Shorter) - 7:57
 "Careful" (Jim Hall) - 6:49
 "Morning Blues" (Michel Petrucciani) - 8:15
 "Waltz New" (Jim Hall) - 5:30
 "Beautiful Love" (King, Young, Alstyne, Gillespie) - 7:19
 "In A Sentimental Mood" (Duke Ellington) - 12:18
 "Bimini" (Jim Hall) - 10:05

Personnel 
 Michel Petrucciani - piano
 Jim Hall - guitar
 Wayne Shorter - tenor saxophone (tracks 1 & 7), soprano saxophone (track 3)

References

1987 albums
Michel Petrucciani live albums
Blue Note Records albums